Parartemia is a genus of brine shrimp endemic to Australia. One species, P. contracta is listed as vulnerable on the IUCN Red List. Parartemia contains the following species:

Parartemia acidiphila Timms & Hudson, 2009
Parartemia auriciforma Timms & Hudson, 2009
Parartemia bicorna Timms, 2010
Parartemia boomeranga Timms, 2010
Parartemia contracta Linder, 1941
Parartemia cylindrifera Linder, 1941
Parartemia extracta Linder, 1941
Parartemia informis Linder, 1941
Parartemia laticaudata Timms, 2010
Parartemia longicaudata Linder, 1941
Parartemia minuta Geddes, 1973
Parartemia mouritzi Timms, 2010
Parartemia purpurea Timms, 2010
Parartemia serventyi Linder, 1941
Parartemia triquetra Timms & Hudson, 2009
Parartemia veronicae Timms, 2010
Parartemia yarleensis Timms & Hudson, 2009
Parartemia zietziana Sayce, 1903

References

Anostraca
Branchiopoda genera
Taxonomy articles created by Polbot